Fujian Benz Automotive Co., Ltd., formerly Fujian Daimler Automotive Co., Ltd., is a light commercial vehicle manufacturing company based in Fuzhou, and a joint venture between Daimler Vans Hong Kong Limited (a joint venture of the Mercedes-Benz Group and China Motor Corporation of Taiwan), BAIC Motor Corporation Limited (35%), and Fujian Motor Industry Group Co., Ltd (15%).

History
The company was founded in June 2007 as Fujian Daimler Automotive Co. by Fujian Motor Industry Group (50%), Daimler (34%) and China Motor Corp. (16%). It began construction of an assembly plant in the Qingkou Investment Zone, Fúzhōu in October 2007. The 660,000 square meter plant would cost over €200 million (US$284 million). With 2,800 employees, the plant has a capacity of 40,000 vehicles a year. For establishing of the joint venture and building the plant facilities, Fujian Motor Industry Group Company and the Hong Kong Daimler Vans Limited invested a total of €434,600,000.

Series production of Fujian Daimler's first product range, the Viano transporter, began in April 2010.

In November, 2011, Sprinter was launched. Fujian Daimler changed its name to Fujian Benz in March 2012 for better brand recognition among Chinese consumers as Daimler is not as well known as Benz.

In March 2013 Fujian Benz opened a new product development center in Fuzhou, constructed at a cost of around RMB 500 million (approximately €60 million).

In Mar. 2016, Fujian Benz launched three V-Class models, including V260, V260 Exclusive and V260L Exclusive.

Operations
Fujian Benz covers 660,000 square meters, including 330,000 square meters for Phase I and a construction area of 162,000 square meters. The company currently employs 1,600 workers.

The annual production capacity of Phase I is 40,000 units. At one time, China was the largest market of the Viano.

At its production plant in Qinkou, Fujian Benz operates a product development center which covers approximately 11,000 square meters of built-up area, as well as a 53,000 square meter proving ground including a 1,400 meter circuit. In an industrial park adjacent to the Qinkou production plant, Fujian Benz operates an EMC lab, an exhaust gas test lab, and a chassis dynamometers facility, which cover a combined built-up area of around 8,000 square meters. The product development center, with a total investment of 500 million rmb, was put into operation in 2013.

Current production
Fujian Benz currently produces the following vehicles:

Former production

References

External links
  

Car manufacturers of China
Truck manufacturers of China
Vehicle manufacturing companies established in 2007
Chinese companies established in 2007
Mercedes-Benz Group joint ventures
Companies based in Fuzhou